The Kawerau Power Station is a 100-megawatt geothermal power plant located just outside the town of Kawerau in the Bay of Plenty Region of New Zealand. The power station is situated within the Kawerau geothermal field, which is part of the Taupo Volcanic Zone. Completed in July 2008 by Mighty River Power at a cost of NZ$300 million, the plant's capacity proved greater than expected. The station is the largest single generator geothermal plant in New Zealand.

Energy production 
The Kawerau geothermal power station boosted the country's geothermal capacity by 25 percent and significantly increased local generation capacity in the Eastern Bay of Plenty. The plant meets approximately one third of residential and industrial demand in the region and provides cost certainty to local industry including Norske Skog Tasman.

The station uses a single Fuji turbine and steam from geothermal bores. The two phase fluid is flashed/separated twice to produce high and low pressure steam to feed the turbine.

The Kawerau field also supplies process steam to the Kawerau pulp and paper mill. This is used for process and power generation. Two small binary power plants use waste hot geothermal water for power generation. Kawerau is the world's premiere geothermal field.

A binary plant is also located west of the main power station. This station uses two phase fluid from one production well, KA24.

In June 2021, the main power station suffered a mechanical failure which resulted in an outage that was expected to extend until 31 August 2021.

Gallery

See also 

Geothermal power in New Zealand

References

External links
New Zealand Geothermal Association (Inc.)
Application for consent to build the new plant
Proposed site for the Kawerau plant

Geothermal power stations in New Zealand
Buildings and structures in the Bay of Plenty Region
Kawerau District
Whakatane Graben
Taupō Volcanic Zone